Marek Filipczak (born 15 April 1960) is a Polish former footballer who played as a forward.

Career

Filipczak started his career with Polish fourth tier side Farmacja Tarchomin. Before the second half of 1980–81, he signed for Polonia Warszawa in the Polish third tier. In 1981, Filipczak signed for Polish top flight club Widzew Łódź, where he made 63 league appearances and scored 16 goals, helping them win the league. Before the 1990 season, he signed for Brann in Norway.

References

External links
 

1960 births
Association football forwards
Bałtyk Gdynia players
Eliteserien players
Expatriate footballers in Norway
Ekstraklasa players
Footballers from Warsaw
I liga players
II liga players
Living people
Olimpia Poznań players
Polish expatriate footballers
Polish expatriate sportspeople in Norway
Polish footballers
Polonia Warsaw players
SK Brann players
Stal Mielec players
Widzew Łódź players